Darashaw is an Indian brokering and investment banking company founded in 1926. Darashaw had the distinction of being the sole broker to the Nizam of Hyderabad, the then single largest player in the capital markets.

Darashaw has the distinction of being the first resource mobilisers and brokers in government securities to be appointed by Reserve Bank of India on the bank's inception in 1935.

The company headquartered in Mumbai has 13 regional offices nationwide.

The company operates in the Indian Debt Market and has a dedicated desk for dealing in the debt market.

Darashaw’s business has been structured on Pan-national Strategic Business Units.

Darashaw provides Retirement Benefit Services, encompassing payroll outsourcing, retirement benefits investment intermediation, advisory, fund management and consulting.

References

External links
the official website
FII moves worry amid global rout
Pair trading pays in volatile markets
Darashaw buys 51% stake in Tata Share Registry
ij jk3/archies-raises-capital-from-bennett-coleman-and-darashaw Archies Raises Capital From Bennett, Coleman And Darashaw

Financial services companies based in Mumbai
Indian companies established in 1926
Financial services companies established in 1926